The Arsikere−Mysore Passenger is a Passenger train belonging to South Western Railway zone that runs between  and  in India. It is currently being operated with 56267/56268 train numbers on a weekly basis.

Service

The 56267/Arsikere–Mysuru Passenger has an average speed of 38 km/hr and covers 168 km in 4h 25m. The 56268/Mysuru–Arsikere Passenger has an average speed of 40 km/hr and covers 168 km in 4h 10m.

Route and halts 

The important halts of the train are:

Coach composition

The train has standard ICF rakes with a max speed of 110 kmph. The train consists of 13 coaches:

 1 Sleeper coach
 10 General Unreserved
 2 Seating cum Luggage Rake

Traction

Both trains are hauled by a Krishnarajapuram Loco Shed-based WDP-4 diesel locomotive from Arsikere to Mysore and vice versa.

See also 

 Mysore Junction railway station
 Arsikere Junction railway station
 Jolarpettai–Bangalore City Express
 Night Queen Passenger
 Bangarapet–Bangalore City Express
 Bangarapet–Marikuppam Passenger

Notes

References

External links 

 56267/Arsikere−Mysuru Passenger India Rail Info
 56268/Mysuru−Arsikere Passenger India Rail Info
 56265/Arsikere−Mysuru Passenger India Rail Info
 56266/Mysuru−Arsikere Passenger India Rail Info

Transport in Mysore
Slow and fast passenger trains in India
Rail transport in Karnataka
Rail transport in Tamil Nadu